Marcel Langsam (26 October 1891 – 21 November 1979) was a Luxembourgian gymnast who competed in the 1912 Summer Olympics. In 1912 he was a member of the Luxembourgian team which finished fourth in the team, European system competition and fifth in the team, free system event.

References

External links
 list of Luxembourgian gymnasts

1891 births
1979 deaths
Luxembourgian male artistic gymnasts
Olympic gymnasts of Luxembourg
Gymnasts at the 1912 Summer Olympics